Domicilium Decoratus: Hillcrest Estate, Beverly Hills, California is a 2006 book on interior design by noted designer Kelly Wearstler, featuring her own home in Beverly Hills, California as the subject of the book.

History
HarperCollins published Kelly Wearstler's Domicilium Decoratus in 2006, a style book featuring photographs of her Beverly Hills mansion and herself dressed in evening gowns. David Colman of The New York Times described it as "a kind of lavish brochure for Ms. Wearstler's vision (she has a fabric line and has carpet, furniture and china lines in the works), which involves a decadent Hollywood riposte to Martha Stewart's stolidly tasteful East Coast domesticity."

See also
Interior design

References

External links
Domicilium Decoratus at HarperCollins Website
Domicilium Decoratus Browser at HarperCollins Website
Luxury Interior Design at Nobili Design Website

Interior design
2006 books
Beverly Hills, California
Books about California
HarperCollins books
Books by Kelly Wearstler